Buck White is the name of:

Buck White (American football), player for Chicago Bulls (AFL)
Buck White (golfer) (born 1911), American golfer
Buck White (musical), a 1969 Broadway musical with music by Oscar Brown, see Muhammad Ali in media and popular culture#Music
Buck White, member of country singing group The Whites with daughters Sharon and Cheryl